The Doctor's Dilemma is a 1958 British comedy-drama film directed by Anthony Asquith and starring Leslie Caron, Dirk Bogarde, Alastair Sim, and
Robert Morley. It is based on the 1906 play The Doctor's Dilemma by George Bernard Shaw. A satire on the pretensions of the medical profession and their concentration on treating patients who can pay well, it contrasts their world of imperfect science, always bumping up against unknowns, with the boundless spheres of love and beauty.

Plot
In London in 1906, some colleagues rush round to the Harley Street house of the unmarried Dr. Ridgeon to congratulate him on being awarded a knighthood for his claim that he can cure tuberculosis (though in reality at that time there was no certain cure). Among them is Dr. Blenkinsop, who was at medical school with him, but now looks after poor patients who cannot afford to pay much, and is himself infected with tuberculosis. Waiting in his hall is the young and lovely Jennifer Dubedat who, having heard of his alleged cure, wants him to treat her husband Louis, a penniless artist. Struck by the beauty and charm of Jennifer, and by the quality of her husband's drawings which she shows him, he lets her believe he will try to save Louis, but stresses that his treatment is long and expensive, and that he can only handle ten patients at a time. So that he can meet Louis, and see more of Jennifer, he invites the two to a celebration dinner he is hosting that night.

While Louis is like his wife good-looking and charming, it emerges that he scorns all trappings of conventional morality, being a feckless liar, thief and seducer (a waitress recognises him as her vanished husband). Now highly doubtful about Louis, Ridgeon arranges with colleagues to visit the studio where he lives and assess his case. Recognising that his TB is far advanced, Ridgeon passes him on to a colleague and decides to take Blenkinsop instead. To Jennifer this is treachery and she begins to hate Ridgeon, while he hopes that he might marry her as soon as she is a widow. Beyond cure, Louis soon dies and in a moving last speech states his belief that love and beauty surpass all of conventional morality. He also begs Jennifer not to mourn, but to marry again and be happy.

In a postscript, Ridgeon attends the one-man exhibition of Louis' works, which are selling well. Jennifer refuses to let him buy a painting and leaves with her new husband.

Production
Gabriel Pascal announced in 1946 he would make the film for Alexander Korda and starring Deborah Kerr. However, it was not made.

Anatole de Grunwald and Anthony Asquith had been developing a film about T. E. Lawrence to star Dirk Bogarde, but it was cancelled at the last minute. This film was offered to Bogarde as an alternative.

In the opening scene, there are two historical errors: Felix Aylmer is seen walking towards the Harley Street of Edwardian days; yet, on a distant wall behind him is a commemorative blue plaque; as he turns into the street, a George the VI letter box awaits him.

Reception
The film was a success in the US, but not Britain. Bogarde later theorised this may have been due to the fact audiences were annoyed to discover the film was not one of the "Doctor" film series. However according to Kinematograph Weekly the film performed "better than average" at the British box office in 1959.

According to MGM records, the film only earned $275,000 in the US and Canada, and $450,000 elsewhere, resulting in a loss of $299,000.

Cast
Leslie Caron as Jennifer Dubedat
Dirk Bogarde as Louis Dubedat
Alastair Sim as Cutler Walpole
Robert Morley as Sir Ralph Bloomfield Bonington
John Robinson as Sir Colenso Ridgeon
Felix Aylmer as Sir Patrick Cullen
Michael Gwynn as Dr. Blenkinsop
Maureen Delaney as Emmy
Alec McCowen as Redpenny
Colin Gordon as Newspaper man
Gwenda Ewen as Minnie Tinwell
Terence Alexander as Mr. Lanchester
Derek Prentice as Head Waiter
Peter Sallis as Art Gallery Secretary (Mr. Denby)
Clifford Buckton as Butcher
Mary Reynolds as Gwenda Ewen

References

External links
 

1958 films
Films based on works by George Bernard Shaw
British films based on plays
Films directed by Anthony Asquith
Metro-Goldwyn-Mayer films
Films with screenplays by Anatole de Grunwald
Films produced by Anatole de Grunwald
Films set in London
Films set in the 1900s
1950s historical comedy-drama films
British historical comedy-drama films
Films scored by Joseph Kosma
Films shot at MGM-British Studios
1950s English-language films
1950s British films